Dantès, or Dai Liang is a French singer-songwriter. He is also a trilingual host (French, Chinese, English) and a writer.

Dantès is an intercultural artist who intertwines Chinese language, the French way of thinking and pop rock.
Dantès' LP, One of a Kind, allowed the French singer and pioneer of the French Mandopop to be invited several times to the most prestigious and popular TV shows in China.

Biography

2005-2011

In 2006 he released a double album entitled Parfums d’extrêmes or Wo jide ni 我记得你 in mandarin Chinese. The same year, the album is distributed in China. In 2007 Dantès is signed and distributed by Jiesheng Record Company.

The Chinese media readily welcomed the sinologist.
Since 2006 several media considers Dantès as the first foreigner who writes and sings his own songs in Chinese.

In April and May 2007, various press conferences were organized for Dantès in Suzhou and Hangzhou, and the artist was even mentioned during the television news.

Furthermore, in January 2007 Dantès is interviewed by the famous host Yi Wen during the Zui ai K ge bang 最爱K歌榜 program in Shanghai Love Radio. Suzhou, Hangzhou and the French Radio of Beijing (RCI) organized long interviews (over an hour each) of Dantès.

In the year 2008 Dantès is invited by the French Television France 3 to talk about his experience and cultural matters.French medias start to focus on Dantès work. At the end of the year, Dantès completes his PhD about the Music Industry in China at the Lyon Jean Moulin University.

In 2009 Dantès releases Dailiang with the Chinese record company Jiesheng. This is his second Chinese-French album. Dantès includes traditional Chinese music aspects to his pop rock tunes: dizi flute, erhu violin, Beijing Opera. The album is distributed the same year in France with the Mosaic music label. Dantès is often invited to perform at the International Channel of Shanghai ICS. He also becomes a host at the Channel Young, a Chinese TV Channel. The same year Dragon TV broadcasts Xia you Dailiang, a Dantès cover story. At the end of 2009 Dantès also organizes a concert in France and will be interviewed by the French médias.

In 2010 Dantès releases Shanghai (single) and Franc Péret shoots a MTV of it.

The same year, Dantès is invited by the French Consulate to perform during the first Shanghai French Music Festival (Fête de la musique) and is promoted as the French man who writes and sings in Chinese. Dantès is interviewed by French journalists who came to cover the 2010 Shanghai Expo. Dantès stands as an ambassador of French culture toward Chinese people along as French politician Jack Lang. Numerous Chinese journalists interview the singer. One of the most complete interview is the one he gave at the Shanghai Expo Site CCTV Studio.

He is invited by the Suzhou Television to perform his hit Liang qian nian wo lai dao Zhongguo.
Dantès comes back another time to the English Channel of Shanghai (ICS) as a guest of Cultural Matters Show where he talks about Beijing Opera and performs his song La muse aux lèvres rouges. In June, Dantès performs at the Shanghai Music Festival for the second time. Between July and August, he records 3 television shows for the Shanghai Media Group where he sings in Shanghainese dialect and reach more fans.
Dantès performs at the 2011 Shanghai French Week with the guitarist Inophis who is also his friend.
He performs a show in France, at the Kbox of Villeurbanne, near the city of Lyon and he is interviewed by le Progrès newspaper

In October, Dantès works on a song with the composer Peter Kam. The song is recorded for Garou who performs the same month a show in the city of Nanning in China.

In 2011 Dantès gets more and more opportunities to work as a Master of Ceremonies. He co-presents with the famous host Sujing, the « 2011 Chinese Culture Foreign Talents Show» for the Suzhou Television.
He is selected to host the YesHJ program « Ohlala ».

2020-2023

In january 2020 Dantès perfoms in Hainan Island for the Wenzhou Chamber of Commerce. Back to France on mid-january and before going on stage for a show in Britanny, the pandemic is starting in China. France Bleu Breizh is interviewing him about it.

The singer is invited by CGTN to sing a song with Joyce Jonathan and Jean-françois Maljean in order to encourage Chinese health workers.

The French journal Le progrès interviews Dantès about his life between China and France. The singer gives interviews to several musical blogs.

In march 2020 Dantès releases on Chinese music platforms Young and Happy in China with his Chinese duo Eva & Dantes.

Confined in France, Dantès uses this opportunity to release the Douce Chine album. The LP is supported by two crowdfundings, one in China, one in France.

In april, Dantes starts a series of livestreams on western platforms : facebook, youtube and Instagram. The singer streams more than 500 livrestreams between 2020 and 2021, reaching almost one million views during this period. Part of these livestreams are shared on Chinese platforms.

French radio France Bleau Isère interviews several times the singer during confinement.

In december 2020, the new french media created by Bernard de la Villardière, Neo, broadcast a short newsstory about Dantes.

In February 2021, Dantès hit the show Ça commence aujourd’hui on France 2, where he talks with Faustine Bollaert during more than twenty minutes about his China story. He sings two of his mandarin top songs, Liangqiannian Wo laidao Zhongguo and Zhongguo de Faguoren. The show is a success and the program is replayed several times, on may 13th, then on 2022.

In 2021 the video clip Zhongguo de Faguoren wins a prize during the Chinese Language Video Festival organized by United Nations and China Media Group.

In 2022, Dantès wins again a prize during the 2022 Chinese Language Video Festival with his video clip Shan de Liwu.

In 2023, Dantès releases his eighth studio album Pop Mandarine.

Discography

 2006 : Parfums d’extrêmes  (China : Zhongguo kexue)
 2007 : Parfums d’extrêmes  (China : Jiesheng, Rest of the World : Plaza Mayor)
 2009 : Dailiang  (China :  Jiesheng, Rest of the World : Plaza Mayor)
 2010 : Shanghai  (Single) (Ulys Music)
 2012 : Oh ma Chérie  (Single) (YesHj)
 2015 : Douce Chine  (Album) (Ulys Music)
 2015 : J'aime la Maurienne  (Single) (Rémi Trouillon)
 2015 : Là-Haut  (Single) (DAILIANG)
 2016 : Moliyene  (Single) (Rémi Trouillon)
 2016 : Raison-Passion  (Single) (DAILIANG)
 2017 : Wo Ai Bulietani  (Single) (Inophis)
 2017 : Et si j'oubliais  (Single) (Inophis)
 2018 :  J'aime la Maurienne  (Album) (DAILIANG / Rémi Trouillon)
 2018 : Partir Loin  (Single) (DAILIANG)
 2018 : Lyon même quand je suis loin  (Single) (DAILIANG / Fux Cartel)
 2018 : 魅力里昂 Meili Li'ang  (Single) (DAILIANG / Fux Cartel)
 2019 : Cette route  (Single) (CGTN Français)
 2019 : Douce Chine  (Album) (Plaza Mayor)
 2021 : Des cimes  (Single) (Winko / Space Party Éditions)
 2021 : 山的礼物  (Single) (Winko / Éditions DAILIANG)
 2022 : 古典 (Single) (Pascal Gallet / Éditions DAILIANG)
 2023 : Pop Mandarine (Album) (Winko / Éditions DAILIANG)

Music Videos 

 2010 :  Shanghai (上海) directed by Franc Péret
 2010 :  Shanghai, directed by Franc Péret
 2012 :  Oh ma chérie, directed by Franc Péret
 2012 :  Français de Chine (中国的法国人), directed by Jiangsu Television
 2016 :  Moliyene (莫里耶讷), directed by Rémi Trouillon
 2016 :   J'aime la Maurienne, directed by par Rémi Trouillon
 2017 :  Wo Ai Bulietani (我爱布列塔尼), directed by Franc Péret
 2018 :  Forever in Bo'ao (永远在博鳌), directed by Duran Du
 2018 :  В Боао навсегда (永远在博鳌), directed by Duran Du
 2018 :  Meili Li'ang (魅力里昂), directed by Franc Péret
 2019 :  Cette route, directed by CGTN (CCTV F)
 2019 :  Douce Chine, directed by Franc Péret
 2021 :  Des cimes, directed by par Widou
 2021 :  山的礼物, directed by par Widou

Main TV Shows and Medias Appearances 

 2013 :
 Xunzhao Xin zhubo, Presenter Contest broadcast in November on Henan Satellite 
 2015 :
 Hello China, Show broadcast in July 2015 on Guangdong Satellite 
 2016 :
 Surname, Program broadcast on Shanxi Satellite 
 2017 :
 Le matin - Bretagne,  Interview broadcast on November 16 on France 3 Bretagne
 2018 :
 La Gaule d'Antoine, Région Auvergne-Rhône-Alpes, Program broadcast on Canal+
 2019 :
 Ceinture et Route Grand Quiz, Program broadcast on CGTN, January
 2019 :
 Quoi de neuf en Chine, Interview broadcast on CGTN
 2019 :
 Luguo Beiwei 18°, Program broadcast on Hainan Satellite
 2021 :
 Ça commence aujourd'hui, Program broadcast on France 2
 2022 :
 China Eco, Program broadcast on BFM Business

References

External links
 ecrit-interprete-chinois-mandarin_1663.html Biography and Titles
 Dantès at the CCTV3
 http://ent.sina.com.cn/v/m/bn/2007-03-30/16319257.html
 Press Conference in Suzhou
 Interview by the city of Hangzhou
 http://ent.sina.com.cn/v/2006-02-27/1002998389.html Name list of the main actors of the soap Tomorrow I am not a Lamb

1979 births
Living people
French pop singers
People from Voiron